Princess Constance Magogo Sibilile Mantithi Ngangezinye kaDinuzulu (1900–1984) was a Zulu princess and artist, mother to Chief Mangosuthu Buthelezi, Inkatha Freedom Party leader, and sister to Zulu King Solomon kaDinuzulu.

Biography
Princess Magogo was born in 1900, the daughter of the Zulu King, Dinuzulu kaCetshwayo (1868–1913) and Queen Silomo. She was taught by her mother and her co-wives and she would sleep at their houses. They brought her up and that is where she learnt traditional instruments.

In 1926 she married Chief Mathole Buthelezi. Princess Magogo composed Zulu classical music and played isigubhu (a stringed bow and a calabash instrument) and isithontolo (a musical instrument which is like a bow which has a string bound down to the middle of the bow) and was also a singer. She continued her music after she married Chief Mathole Buthelezi contributing to traditional music. She was a seventh day adventist member.

As imbongi (praise singer) she transcended the boundaries of this role, which was traditionally a male preserve, to lament on her marriage and the lives of especially the Zulu people. Her career gained momentum in 1939 with a recording of some of her performances by Hugh Tracey. In making public appearances the Princess again broke custom, maintaining her dedication to music. By the 1950s, her music was widely recorded and played by the South African Broadcasting Corporation (SABC), David Rycroft and West German Radio. These recordings afforded Magogo an international audience and recognition. Her work was made largely from existing Zulu songs and folktales, and she extended them into music accompanied by the ugubhu.

Death and legacy
She died in Durban in 1984. In December 2003 she was posthumously awarded the South African National Order of Ikhamanga in Gold for her composition and contribution to the preservation and development of traditional music in South Africa.

In 2002 an opera, Princess Magogo, was performed based on her life. It was performed by Opera Africa for three evenings in Durban in May 2002. Mzilikazi Khumalo, composed the music and the librettist was Themba Msimang. Sibongile Khumalo, played the title role.

References

Sources
Constance Buthelezi on "African Composers"
https://web.archive.org/web/20051219180245/http://www.chfestival.org/publications/Princess_Magogo_Study_Guide.pdf

1900 births
1984 deaths
African princesses
South African musicians
South African women musicians
Zulu royalty
Zulu people
Recipients of the Order of Ikhamanga
20th-century South African musicians
20th-century women musicians